South High School was a public high school in Springfield, Ohio. It was one of two high schools in the Springfield City School District (SCSD), the other school being North High School.  The school was created in 1960 when the original Springfield High School was divided into North and South High Schools. South was housed in the original Springfield High School, built in 1911, and assumed the SHS school colors of blue and gold and the athletic team name Wildcats. The building was designed by Albert Pretzinger of Dayton and modeled after the Library of Congress.

South was closed in 2008 when enrollment declines in the Springfield City School District necessitated consolidating the two high schools and re-establishing Springfield High School. The new Springfield High School was built at what had been the North High School campus and the North High School building was demolished. Thanks to a large state grant, local donations, and the school district's investment, the former South High School building reopened in 2015 as the Springfield Center of Innovation: The Dome.  It is still owned and operated by the Springfield City School District.  SCSD operates the CareerConnectED Center and John Legend Theater within the building, and leases space in the Dome to the Global Impact STEM Academy and to Clark State Community College.

Athletics
Springfield South and North had a cross-town rivalry; South has beaten North in 4 of their past 25 meetings in basketball.
The 2002-2003 Springfield South football team went to the Elite Eight in the 2002.

Notable people
Fred Foster; professional basketball player in the National Basketball Association (NBA)
Alaina Reed Hall, actress, starring on the television series Sesame Street and 227
John Legend, singer, songwriter, record producer, actor.

References

External links
 District Website

Defunct schools in Ohio
Buildings and structures in Springfield, Ohio